Back at One is the fifth studio album by American singer Brian McKnight, released on September 21, 1999, by Motown Records. The album followed the same pattern as McKnight's previous album of original material, Anytime (1997), in which he began his transition from urban adult contemporary into the hip hop soul market. Back at One contains a mix of hip hop-influenced contemporary R&B songs, as well as a variety of  ballads. While McKnight co-wrote and produced nearly every song on the album, he also worked with a few new producers, including Rodney Jerkins, his brother Fred Jerkins III, and Anthony Nance.

Upon its release, the album received generally mixed reviews from music critics. A commercial success, Back at One sold 144,000 units in its first week of release, reaching number seven on the US Billboard 200. McKnight's most successful album to date, it sold more than 3.0 million copies worldwide and was certified triple platinum by the Recording Industry Association of America (RIAA) and platinum by Music Canada. The album produced three singles, including its title track which reached number two in the US, and garnered nominations for the Grammy Award for Best R&B Album and the Soul Train Music Award for Best R&B/Soul Album.

Background
In 1997, Brian McKnight released his third studio album Anytime. Following the moderate success of his previous album I Remember You (1995), the singer, who was used to writing, playing and producing most of his music by himself, decided to work with a wider range of musicians on the album, including Sean "Puffy" Combs, Keith Thomas, and Poke & Tone. However, while Anytime exposed McKnight to a wider audience, taking his work further into the hip hop soul genre, McKnight disliked their approach to incorporate sampling on their songs. After the commercial triumph of Anytime, McKnight signed with Motown Records to release his first Christmas album Bethlehem (1998) and began work on his fourth album. While he enjoyed working on the record, McKnight was tormented by personal problems during the production process since he had fallen in love with someone else outside of his marriage with his wife Julie. In a 2012 interview, McKnight elaborated : "If Anytime was the spark, then Back at One became the fire. I was doing things then that I had never done before, that an audience had never heard or seen [...]  I don't even listen to that record because it was the highest and lowest point of my life, because of this person."

Critical reception

Stephen Thomas Erlewine from Allmusic felt that with Back at One "McKnight has figured out a way to make his gospel-flavored contemporary urban soul sound fresh, mainly by keeping the focus on the songs. There's nothing extraneous on Back at One: All 13 songs are given clean presentations, and he blesses them with impassioned performances. At times, the material itself is not particularly interesting, but most albums have filler; what counts is the good stuff, and there's enough of it on Back at One to make it another solid effort from McKnight." In a contemporary review, The Rolling Stone Album Guide wrote that "excepting the occasional boilerplate slow jam, One is McKnight's finest effort."

Writing for Billboard, Michael Paoletta found that "like its predecessor, 1997's Anytime, Back at One finds the singer keeping it sublime yet simple on an acoustic-based set. This, of course, allows McKnight ample room to showcase his smooth, simmering vocals." In her review for the Los Angeles Times, Connie Johnson wrote that "McKnight records the ultimate background music, ideally suited for a candlelight dinner for two, not to mention more intimate interludes – music that's not distracting, in other words. McKnight is certainly not unpredictable [...] Everything is as classy and correct as one would expect from a McKnight project. Basically, it's pretty but not essential."

Chart performance
In the United States, Back at One debuted and peaked at number seven on the Billboard 200, selling 144,000 copies in its first week. This marked McKnight's highest first weeks sales as well as highest-charting debut then, according to SoundScan. In addition, it reached the top five on Billboards Top R&B/Hip-Hop Albums chart, becoming McKnight's third album to do so. With sales in excess of more than 3.0 million copies, the album went on to become McKnight's biggest seller within his discography. It was eventually certified triple platinum by the Recording Industry Association of America (RIAA). Billboard ranked the album 56th and 37th on its Top R&B/Hip-Hop Albums year-end rankings in 1999 and 2000, respectively. Also McKnight's first album to chart internationally, Back at One entered the top twenty in Canada, where it certified platinum by Music Canada.

"Back at One", the album's title track, was issued as the album's lead single. It reached number two on the US Billboard Hot 100 and hit number seven on the Hot R&B/Hip-Hop Songs, becoming McKnight's highest-charting single to date. In addition, it became a top ten hit in Canada and New Zealand, and entered the top thiry in Australia and the Netherlands. Jerkins-produced "Stay or Let It Go" was released on a double single with the song "Win", McKnight's contribution to the soundtrack of the 2000 American drama film Men of Honor. It reached the lower half of the Billboard Hot 100 and peaked at number 26 on the Hot R&B/Hip-Hop Songs, with "Win" reaching number 51. Third and final single "6, 8, 12" entered the top fifty on the Hot R&B/Hip-Hop Songs.

Track listing

Notes
 signifies a co-producer.

Personnel
Credits adapted from the liner notes of Back at One.

 Tom Bender – mixing assistant 
 Jerry Christie – assistant engineer 
 Derek "Hot Sauce" Cumming – guitars 
 LaShawn Daniels – vocal production 
 Dylan "3D" Dresdow – mixing assistant 
 Jean-Marie Horvat – engineer and mixing 
 Dave Fredric – assistant engineer 
 Mick Guzauski – mixing 
 Anthony Jeffries – engineer 
 Fred Jerkins III – music and production 
 Rodney Jerkins – music and production 
 Greg Leisz – pedal steel 
 Harvey Mason, Jr. – additional music, programming, Pro Tools, and engineer 
 Brian McKnight – vocals , production and arrangements , keyboards , drum programming , bass , percussion 
 "McNoche" – guitars 
 Bill K. Meyers – orchestral arrangements 
 Anthony Nance – co-producer , drum programming , synth bass , keyboards 
 Dave "Hard Drive" Pensado – mixing 
 Herb Powers – mastering
 Wayne S. Rodrigues – Scratches 
 Mary Ann Souza – assistant engineer 
 Tommy Vicari – orchestral engineer 
 Chris Wood – engineer

Charts

Weekly charts

Year-end charts

Certifications

References

External links

1999 albums
Brian McKnight albums
Albums produced by Brian McKnight
Albums produced by Rodney Jerkins
Motown albums